Collytus or Kollytos was a deme of ancient Attica, located in the city of Athens. It was located within the walls of Themistocles, south of the Areopagus and southwest of Acropolis. It was famed due to its association with Plato, whose family was from this deme.

Etymology 
According to legend the name of the deme comes from Collytus, the father of Diomus, the favourite of Heracles. For this reason it was believed that Collytus's deme was part of Melite.

Description 
Collytus was one of the richest demoi in the city of Athens and there were many aristocratic residences; the Peisistratos owned a house from which they often governed the city.

The rural Dionysias (festival of Dionysus) took place there, which shows that the deme was also an important agricultural center. Aeschines recited in the theater of Dionysus in the deme, and was so embarrassed of his role that he renounced the theater and gave himself to politics.

In the narrow main street of the deme there was a very popular market.

People
Adeimantus of Collytus, Plato's brother
Ariston of Athens (d. 424 BCE), Plato's father
Agyrrhius (fl. 4th century BCE), general
Glaucon, Plato's brother
Hypereides, politician and speechwriter
Potone, Plato's sister

References

Populated places in ancient Attica
Former populated places in Greece
Demoi